1837 Osita is a stony Flora asteroid from the inner regions of the asteroid belt, approximately 7 kilometers in diameter. It was discovered on 16 August 1971, by American astronomer James Gibson at the Yale–Columbia Southern Station of the Leoncito Astronomical Complex in Argentina, who named it after his wife Ursula ("Osita").

Orbit and classification 

The S-type asteroid is a member of the Flora family, one of the largest groups of stony asteroids in the main-belt. It orbits the Sun in the inner main-belt at a distance of 2.0–2.4 AU once every 3 years and 3 months (1,196 days). Its orbit has an eccentricity of 0.09 and an inclination of 4° with respect to the ecliptic.

Physical characteristics 

PanSTARRSs large-scale survey also classified Osita as a rare AQ-type, having intermediate spectral characteristics of an A and Q type asteroid.

Rotation period 

In February 2006, a rotational lightcurve of Osita was obtained from photometric observation by French amateur astronomer René Roy, giving a well-defined rotation period of 3.81880 hours with a brightness variation of 0.48 magnitude. Photometric observations in the R-band at the Palomar Transient Factory in October 2011, gave a concurring period of 3.8186 hours and an amplitude of 0.59 magnitude. A third period of 3.81880 hours was derived from a large international data-mining collaboration in February 2016.

Diameter and albedo 

According to the surveys carried out by the Japanese Akari satellite and NASA's Wide-field Infrared Survey Explorer with its subsequent NEOWISE mission, Osita measures between 7.53 and 7.94 kilometers in diameter, and its surface has an albedo between 0.194 and 0.216.

The Collaborative Asteroid Lightcurve Link assumes an albedo of 0.24 – derived from 8 Flora, the largest member and namesake of this orbital family – and calculates a diameter of 7.14 kilometers with an absolute magnitude of 12.9.

Naming 

This minor planet was named by the discoverer for his wife Ursula ("Osita" is the Spanish equivalent). She volunteered as an assistant and actively participated in the observations by measuring or reducing more than 150 positions of comets and minor planets. The official  was published by the Minor Planet Center on 20 February 1976.

References

External links 
 Asteroid Lightcurve Database (LCDB), query form (info )
 Dictionary of Minor Planet Names, Google books
 Asteroids and comets rotation curves, CdR – Observatoire de Genève, Raoul Behrend
 Discovery Circumstances: Numbered Minor Planets (1)-(5000) – Minor Planet Center
 
 

001837
Discoveries by James B. Gibson (astronomer)
Named minor planets
19710816